Cyclus may refer to:
Literary cycle
Cyclus (genus), a genus of prehistoric crustaceans
Cyclus (installation art), a piece of installation art by Vasko Lipovac